Shandan County is a county in Gansu Province, the People's Republic of China, bordering Inner Mongolia to the north. It is under the administration of the prefecture-level city of Zhangye. It is an important site located on the ancient Silk Road. Its postal code is 734100, and in 1999 its population was 194,901 people. It is known for horses and pastures. Ancient Han people called the horses as 'heavenly western horses'. The region's lakes provide water to the animals on the pastures.

Administrative divisions
Shandan County is divided to 6 towns, 2 townships and 2 others.
Towns

Townships
 Laojun
 Liqiao()

Others
 State-owned Shandan Farm
 Shandan Racecourse of China Animal Husbandry Company

Climate

Transport 
China National Highway 312

See also
 List of administrative divisions of Gansu

References

 Official website of the county government

Shandan County
Zhangye